The Asian Junior Cycling Championships are annual continental cycling championships for road bicycle racing and track cycling since unknown years, exclusively for Asian junior cyclists selected by the national governing body (member nations of the Asian Cycling Confederation).

Competitions

Men's road events

Individual road race

Individual time trial

Women's road events

Individual road race

Individual time trial

Men's track events

Sprint

1 km time trial

Keirin

Individual pursuit

Points race

Scratch

Madison

Elimination race

Team sprint

Team pursuit

Women's track events

Sprint

500 m time trial

Keirin

Individual pursuit

Points race

Scratch

Elimination race

Team sprint

Team pursuit

Footnotes

External links
 
 
 
 

 
Cycling
Asian
Cycle racing in Asia